Below is a list of notable and famous handballers who have played for RK Zamet. Due to incomplete data some positions aren't written.

Hall of Fame
This section is for players who started their career in Zamet and won at least a bronze medal with the national team. Based on the list from RK Zamet. The hall of fame was unveiled to the public September 30, 2015. 
The hall of fame is located in the hall of Centar Zamet.

Players listed
Alvaro Načinović
Valter Matošević
Mirza Džomba
Nikola Blažičko
Renato Sulić
Mateo Hrvatin

Notable players
To appear in this section a player must have satisfied all of the following three criteria:
 (1) player has have played at least 4 years (players listed with fewer where they made great contribution during seasons in which they played);
 (2) player has to have had an impact in season if not met criteria (1) (domestic and European);
 (3) player has played at least one international match for their national team while under contract with Zamet.;

 
 Stanko Jerger (1957-1963)
 Andrija Barin (1957-1964)
 Albert Lenac (1957-1962)
 Vilim Blažić (1957-1962)
 Ivan Munitić (1959-1963, 1964-1966)
 Mladenko Mišković (1963-1972)
 Simeon Kosanović (1964-1969)
 Željko Kosanović (1965-1969)
 Ratomir Jajaš (1970-1975)
 Marijan Seđak (1968-1971, 1973-1979)
 Darko Srdoč (1972-1979)
 Ivica Rimanić (1972-1974, 1977-1980)
 Željko Tomac (1973-1983)
 Željko Milanović (1974-1984)
 Željko Gašperov (1974-1982)
 Valter Marković (1975-1988)
 Darko Drobina (1976-1981)
 Williams Černeka (1976-1985)
 Jurica Lakić (1976-1981)
 Predrag Sikimić (1977-1985)
 Damir Čavlović (1977-1980, 1981-1985)
 Roberto Sošić (1979-1981)
 Valter Periša (1979-1988)
 Boris Komucki (1979-1981, 1983-1985)
 Darko Dunato (1979-1989, 1991-1992)
 Boris Dragičević (1980-1990, 1992-1993)
 Ante Vuletić (1980-1988)
 Dragan Straga (1980-1981, 1982-1988)
 Drago Žiljak (1981-1991)
 Marin Mišković (1982-1992, 1995-1998)
 Alvaro Načinović (1983-1991, 1992-1993, 1998-1999)
 Vlado Vukoje (1983-1984)
  Dean Ožbolt (1985-2000)
 Darko Franović (1985-1993, 1997-1999)
 Tonči Peribonio (1986-1991)
  Valter Matošević (1987-1993, 1996-1999, 2009–2010)
  Mladen Prskalo (1987-1992, 1996-2000, 2005–2006)
  Valner Franković (1987-1993)
  Igor Pejić (1988-1997, 2003)
  Damir Bogdanović (1988-1997, 1998-1999 2002-2006)
  Marin Miculinić (1988-1999, 2002)
  Igor Dokmanović (1990-1996, 2007-2008)
  Siniša Eraković (1990-1997)
 Sanjin Lučičanin (1992-1997)
 Danijel Riđić (1992-2000)
 Mirza Džomba (1993-1997)
 Nikola Blažičko (1994-1999, 2002-2004)
 Milan Uzelac (1995-1996, 1997-2001, 2002–2017)
 Robert Savković (1995-1999, 2002-2003, 2006–2007, 2009-2010)
 Tino Černjul (1995-1998, 2002-2005)
 Igor Saršon (1995-2005, 2012)
 Renato Sulić (1995-1999, 2000-2001)
 Bojan Pezelj (1995-2002)
 Mario Jozak (1995-2001)
 Irfan Smajlagić (1996-1997)
 Ivan Vukas (1997-2001)
 Silvio Ivandija (1997-1999)
 Vladimir Šujster (1998-1999)
 Borna Franić (1999-2002)
 Edin Bašić (1999-2001)
 Ivan Stevanović (1999-2007, 2010-2012)
 Mateo Hrvatin (2000-2009, 2010-2013, 2015–2017)
 Boris Batinić (2000-2004)
 Marko Erstić (2000-2009)
 Davor Šunjić (2000-2005, 2012-2013)
 Mirjan Horvat (2001-2005, 2007-2009)
 Petar Misovski (2001-2002)
 Vedran Banić (2002-2007)
 Zlatko Saračević (2002-2003)
 Jakov Gojun (2004-2008)
 Ivan Ćosić (2004-2009, 2011-2013)
 Josip Crnić (2005-2008)
 Marin Sakić (2005-2013)
 Ivan Pešić (2006-2008)
 Krešimir Kozina (2007-2011)
 Marin Kružić(2007-2013, 2016–2018)
 Damir Vučko (2007-2015, 2017–2018)
 Ivan Karabatić (2008-2009)
 Luka Kovačević (2008-2016)
 Dario Černeka (2008-2016)
 Dino Slavić (2008-2016)
 Marin Đurica (2008–2017)
 Bojan Lončarić (2010-2016)
 Matija Golik (2010–2018)
 Luka Mrakovčić (2011-2015)
 Raul Valković (2012–2017)
 Lovro Jotić (2014–2015)
 Jadranko Stojanović (2015-2017)
 Tin Lučin (2016-2017)

Source: www.rk-zamet.hr. Last updated 14 May 2018.

National team players
This list notes Zamet players who have played made at least one appearance for a national team.
To appear in this section a player must have satisfied all of the following three criteria:
Player has played at least one international match for their national team while having played for Zamet before or after having played for their national team;

  Edin Bašić
  Danijel Riđić
  Aleksandar Škorić
  Nikola Blažičko 
  Roberto Borčić
  Teo Čorić
  Mirza Džomba
  Borna Franić
  Valner Franković 
  Darko Franović
  Mateo Hrvatin
  Robert Ipša
  Krešimir Ivanković
  Silvio Ivandija
  Lovro Jotić
  Božidar Jović
  Krešimir Kozina
  Tin Lučin
  Vladimir Ostarčević
  Dean Ožbolt 
  Egon Paljar
  Ivan Pešić
  Ivan Pongračić 
  Mladen Prskalo
  Diego Modrušan
  Ivan Stevanović
  Renato Sulić
  Vladimir Šujster 
  Igor Vujić
  Ivan Vukas
   Marko Bagarić
  Ljubomir Bošnjak-Flego
  Marjan Kolev
  Petar Misovski
  Zhao Chen
  Wang Quan
  Željko Hornjak
  Michal Jančo
  Jurij Hauha
  Jurica Lakić 
  Ivica Rimanić
  Roberto Sošić 
  Vlado Vukoje
    Zlatko Saračević
   Valter Matošević
   Alvaro Načinović
   Tonči Peribonio
   Irfan Smajlagić 

Source: www.rk-zamet.hr. Last updated 14 May 2018.

Flags indicate which national team the players played for. Players listed in alphabetical order by last name.

European Champions Cup/EHF Champions League winners
Winners of EHF Champions League (formerly called European Champions Cup) by player that played for Zamet.
Alvaro Načinović (RK Zagreb Loto) - 1992
Nino Marković (RK Zagreb Loto) - 1992
Božidar Jović (RK Zagreb Loto), (RK Badel 1862 Zagreb)  - 1992, 1993
Tonči Peribonio (RK Badel 1862 Zagreb) - 1993
Mirza Džomba (BM Ciudad Real) - 2006

Homegrown players with most appearances in national team

External links
Official website of RK Zamet (Croatian)
 (English)

References

RK Zamet
 
Zamet